Mad Jack the Pirate is an American animated comedy-adventure television series. The show was created by Bill Kopp and was directed by Jeff DeGrandis (who previously worked together on Toonsylvania). On American television, the show was broadcast on Fox Kids. 

The show is about the rather unsuccessful and quite cowardly Pirate Jack (voiced by Bill Kopp), who despite his repeated failures never doubts his own excellence, and his dim-witted anthropomorphic rat sidekick Snuk (voiced by Billy West) as they sail the seas on their ship the Sea Chicken.

Critics have noted that the clear inspiration for the show is the 1983-1989 BBC comedy series Blackadder. Jack bears a striking resemblance to Edmund Blackadder and Snuk to Baldrick. There is even some dialogue taken straight from the BBC series. Jack's arch-enemy Flash resembles Blackadder's Lord Flashheart, and Angus is almost identical to Blackadder's Lord Angus.

The series has been released on DVD in Romania (under the title Piratul Jack cel Teribil), and on VCD in Turkey (under the title Çılgın Korsan Jack). Also in Turkey, the cartoon was shown on Jetix Play and in Poland on Fox Kids. 

Ownership of the series passed to Disney in 2001 when Disney acquired Fox Kids Worldwide, which also includes Saban Entertainment. But the series is not available on Disney+.

Cast 
 Bill Kopp as Mad Jack
 Billy West as Snuk
 Jess Harnell as Flash Dashing, Deity, Sterrol Flynn, Skeleton, Landlord of The Rabid Weasel, Baron Stevie Ray von Ribbentrop, Gnome #1, Stuey, Tribal Chief, Peter Lawford, Giant, Mummy, Police Officer #2
 Robert Pike Daniel as Angus Dagnabbit
 Tom Kenny as Sir Percy, Waiter, French Resort manager, Wooden Stakes Merchant, Vulgarian citizen, Crab King, Snow Sultan, Town Messenger, Uncle Mortimer's Attorney, Tribal Member
 Charlie Adler as Mrs. Grunion
 Cam Clarke as Sternly Ed Nerwood, Tolouse, Gnome #2, Arturo Caliente
 Sandy Fox as Magic Pink Fairy
 Brad Garrett as Darsh the Dragon, Biclops, Frank Sinatra
 Kevin Meaney as Chuck the Imitation Crab
 Valery Pappas as Witch
 Jocelyn Blue as Additional Voices
 Sherman Howard as Additional Voices
 Joyce Lang as Additional Voices
 Steve Ochs as Additional Voices
 Jay Robinson as Additional Voices
 April Winchell as Princess, Check-inn Lady, The Enchantress Victoria's Guard

Episodes

References

External links 

Mad Jack the Pirate at Don Markstein's Toonopedia. Archived from the original on February 11, 2016.

Fictional pirates
Fox Kids
1990s American animated television series
1998 American television series debuts
1999 American television series endings
American children's animated adventure television series
American children's animated comedy television series
Fox Broadcasting Company original programming
Television series by Saban Entertainment
YTV (Canadian TV channel) original programming